The Sonny & Cher Comedy Hour was an American variety show that starred American pop singers Sonny Bono and Cher, who were married to each other at the time. The show ran on CBS in the United States, and premiered in August 1971. The show was cancelled in May 1974, due to the couple's divorce, but the duo reunited in 1976 for the similarly formatted The Sonny & Cher Show (a title sporadically used during the run of the Comedy Hour), which ran for two seasons, ending August 29, 1977.

The Sonny & Cher Comedy Hour (1971–1974)
By 1971, Sonny & Cher had stopped producing hit singles as a duet act. Cher's first feature film, Chastity, was not a success, and the duo decided to sing and tell jokes in nightclubs across the country. CBS head of programming Fred Silverman saw them one evening and offered them their own show. The Sonny & Cher Comedy Hour was originally supposed to be a summer replacement series, but high ratings gave Silverman sufficient reason to bring it back later that year, with a permanent spot on the schedule. The show was taped at CBS Television City in Hollywood.

The show was a top-20 hit in the ratings for its entire run. Each episode opened with the show's theme song, which segued into the first few notes of "The Beat Goes On". Every episode, Sonny exchanged banter with Cher, allowing Cher to put down Sonny in a sarcastic, yet comic manner. Comedy skits followed, mixed with musical numbers.  At the end of each episode, Sonny and Cher sang their hit "I Got You Babe" to the audience, sometimes with their son Chaz (Then known as Chastity, as he was assigned female at birth, but later transitioned male) in tow.

Many regular cast members appeared in sketches.  Some notables include Teri Garr, Murray Langston (who later found brief fame as he Unknown Comic on The Gong Show), and Steve Martin (who also served as one of the show's writers). Regulars included:

Peter Cullen (1971-1974)
Freeman King (1971-1974)
Murray Langston (1971-1974)
Clark Carr (1971-1972)
Tom Solari (1971-1972)
Ted Zeigler (1971-1974)
Steve Martin (1972-1975)
Billy Van (1973-1976)
Bob Einstein (1973-1974)
Teri Garr (1973-1974)

Among the many guests who appeared on The Sonny & Cher Comedy Hour were Carol Burnett, George Burns, Glen Campbell, Tony Curtis, Bobby Darin, Phyllis Diller, Farrah Fawcett, Merv Griffin, The Jackson 5, Jerry Lee Lewis, Ronald Reagan, Burt Reynolds, The Righteous Brothers, Dinah Shore, Sally Struthers, The Supremes, Chuck Berry, and Dick Clark.

The show was scheduled to return for a fourth season in October 1974, but Sonny and Cher separated that fall, resulting in the cancellation of the show.

In 2004, selected episodes from The Sonny & Cher Comedy Hour were released in a three-disc set called The Sonny & Cher Ultimate Collection: The Best of The Sonny & Cher Comedy Hour and The Sonny & Cher Show on Region 1 DVD.

Recurring routines
The Vamp Sketch: A sequence featuring at least three mini-skits, Cher played notorious women in history (e.g.: Cleopatra, Nefertiti, Marlene Dietrich), each one preceded by Cher in a parlor setting lying atop an old-style upright piano with Sonny pretending to play, singing one verse of the song between each mini-skit (the lyrics usually set up the next mini-skit), followed by the chorus, "She was a scamp, a camp and a bit of a tramp, she was a V-A-M-P, vamp". It ended with all the characters from each skit (even Sonny and Cher, via camera trickery, in their respective costumes) all converging to sing the final chorus together. In later seasons, the Vamp sketch was replaced with "Shady Miss Lady Luck", a similar group of mini-sketches that were bracketed by Cher in a Las Vegas-style setting.
Sonny's Pizza: Sonny is the proprietor of a pizza restaurant whose food, according to almost everyone except Sonny himself, is not fit to be eaten (the logo on the front door is augmented with the slogan, "You won't believe you ate the whole thing", a play on the then-popular Alka-Seltzer commercial).
Mr. & Ms.: This gender-bending sketch has Cher as the breadwinner in the household, working as a business executive and wearing a three-piece suit. She would come home to Sonny, a beleaguered house-husband who usually complained about how bad his day had been.
 The Fortune Teller: Cher is inside a fortune-telling vending machine. When Sonny inserted a quarter to hear his fortune, she would give bad news or insults, but anyone else, particularly a given week's guest star, would get a good fortune that would almost immediately come true.
 At the Launderette: A laundromat sketch that has Cher as Laverne, a housewife with tacky fashion sense cracking jokes to straight-woman Olivia, played by Garr.

The Sonny Comedy Revue 
In 1974, Sonny and Cher agreed to end the show, as they were separating from each other. Their timeslot was given to Tony Orlando and Dawn the next fall. They both starred in separate variety shows over the next two years. Sonny Bono's 1974 variety series, The Sonny Comedy Revue, led off the ABC Sunday-night lineup, but lasted just 13 episodes. While it retained the creative team behind The Sonny & Cher Comedy Hour, Bono's solo effort was largely a victim of the show's weak time slot and the established hits it faced on NBC and CBS. Initially, when  Cher was reported as appearing in her own show on CBS,TV Guide predicted that Sonny's show would be the greater success.

Cher 
Starting in early 1975, Cher also returned to network television with her solo variety show, entitled Cher, which also aired on CBS.  It did well during its abbreviated run and was renewed for the 1975–76 season. During the second season, though, Cher herself decided to end the show to work with Sonny again. Although Sonny's show had most of the cast and crew from the comedy hour (except the musical director) and was expected to be the bigger hit, Cher's show easily became the greater success, both in the ratings and by fan response. Due to contracts, Cher was unable to perform many of her sketches and characters from the comedy hour on her show; Sonny had them on his show, instead.

Among the many guests who appeared on the Cher show were Bette Midler, Elton John, Pat Boone, David Bowie, Ray Charles, Steve Martin, The Jackson 5, Ike & Tina Turner, Dion, Wayne Newton, Linda Ronstadt, Flip Wilson, Lily Tomlin, Frankie Valli, Tatum O'Neal, Raquel Welch, Wayne Rogers, and Labelle.

The Sonny and Cher Show (1976–1977)
In February 1976, the bitterness of their divorce behind them, the couple reunited for  The Sonny and Cher Show. This incarnation of the series was produced by veteran musical variety-show writers, Frank Peppiatt and John Aylesworth. It was basically the same format as their first variety series, but with different writers to create new sketches and songs. A new logo – a stylized hand with fingers crossed – symbolized their working relationship.

The duo's opening conversations were markedly more subdued and made low-key references to the couple's divorce, as well as Cher's subsequent marriage to Gregg Allman. (During production, Cher was pregnant with and eventually bore Allman's son, Elijah). Some jokes would become awkward; in one opening segment Cher gave Sonny a compliment, and Sonny jokingly replied "That's not what you said in the courtroom!" Nonetheless, the revived series garnered enough ratings to be renewed for a second season. By this time, however, the variety show genre was already in steep decline, and Sonny and Cher was one of the few successful programs of the genre remaining on the air. The show's final season, which aired as a mid-season replacement in the winter of 1977, was moved to the Friday night death slot, with the last episodes burned off in a late-evening Monday night time slot not typically used for comedy or variety series that summer.

The cast of regulars included Comedy Hour alums Ted Zeigler and Billy Van, Gailard Sartain (on loan from Peppiatt and Aylesworth's other series Hee Haw), announcer Jack Harrell (who later gained fame as the longtime announcer for the original version of The People's Court), and mime duo Shields and Yarnell.  Billy Van left the show during season 1.

Some of the guests who appeared on The Sonny and Cher Show included Lynn Anderson, Frankie Avalon, Muhammad Ali, Raymond Burr, Ruth Buzzi, Charo, Barbara Eden, Neil Sedaka, Farrah Fawcett, Bob Hope, Don Knotts, Jerry Lewis, Tony Orlando, The Osmonds, Debbie Reynolds, The Smothers Brothers, Tina Turner, Twiggy, The Jacksons, and Betty White.

Production notes
The Sonny & Cher Comedy Hour taped its opening and closing segments in front of a live studio audience. The Sonny & Cher "concert" segment was also taped in front of the same audience, as were some of the segments featuring musical guest stars—as these typically were taped after the closing segment was completed. Due to blocking, costuming, and other staging and production requirements, most of the comedy segments were taped without an audience, with a laugh track added in postproduction.

Broadcast history and Nielsen ratings

The Sonny & Cher Comedy Hour

The Sonny and Cher Show

Reception
The series earned one Emmy award out of 22 nominations for Art Fisher for Outstanding Directorial Achievement in Variety or Music in 1972. Fisher also received Emmy nominations for his work in 1973 and 1974, as did Tim Kiley as director for the series in 1976. Other Emmy nominations were for Outstanding Variety Series in 1972, 1973 and 1974; Outstanding New Series in 1972; Outstanding Single Program - Variety or Music in 1972; Outstanding Writing Achievement in Variety for Bob Arnott, Chris Bearde, Allan Blye, George Burditt, Bob Einstein, Phil Hahn, Coslough Johnson and Paul Wayne in 1972 and 1974 (Steve Martin also was nominated in the category in 1972 and Jim Mulligan was in 1974); Outstanding Achievement in Costume Design for Bob Mackie and Ret Turner in 1972, 1974 and 1977; Outstanding Achievement in Music, Lyrics and Special Material for Earl Brown in 1972 and 1973; Outstanding Achievement in Musical Direction for James E. Dale in 1972 and for Marty Paich in 1974; Outstanding Achievement in Lighting Direction for John R. Beam in 1973; Outstanding Achievement in Technical Direction for technical director Charles Franklin and cameramen Gorman Erickson, Jack Jennings, Tom McConnell, Barney Neeley and Richard Nelson in 1973; and Outstanding Achievement in Any Area of Creative Technical Crafts for Rena Leuschner for hairdressing in 1974.

The Sonny & Cher Comedy Hour also earned Golden Globe nominations in 1973 and 1974 for Best Television Series - Musical or Comedy and a win for Cher for Best Performance by an Actress in a Television Series - Comedy or Musical.

Syndication
Reruns of the series were seen on TV Land at the time of its launch in April 1996, with both the 1971–74 series and the 1976–77 series being treated as one; however, only about 65 of the original 100 episodes were aired. TV Land then edited the shows down to 30-minute episodes from the original hour, and ultimately discontinued broadcasting the series in 2000. From 2016-2020, getTV broadcast several episodes of both the 1971–74 and 1976–77 series, including some which had never aired on TV Land. In addition, getTV also carried the series Cher under a separate contract.

List of guest stars

A
Don Adams
Jack Albertson
Muhammad Ali
Lynn Anderson
Paul Anka
Frankie Avalon

B
Rona Barrett
Barbi Benton
Chuck Berry
Ken Berry
Dr. Joyce Brothers
Jim Brown
Carol Burnett
George Burns
Raymond Burr
Ruth Buzzi
John Byner
Edd Byrnes

C
Glen Campbell
Truman Capote
Art Carney
Diahann Carroll
Charo
Dick Clark
The Coasters
Mike Connors
William Conrad
Rita Coolidge
Howard Cosell
Larry Csonka
Tony Curtis

D
Bobby Darin
John Davidson
Billy Davis Jr.
The DeFranco Family
Phyllis Diller
Sandy Duncan
Jimmy Durante

E
Barbara Eden
Ralph Edwards
Chad Everett

F
Douglas Fairbanks Jr.
Fanny
Farrah Fawcett
Glenn Ford
Tennessee Ernie Ford
George Foreman
Redd Foxx

G
Paul Michael Glaser
George Gobel
Robert Goulet
The Grass Roots
Peter Graves
Lorne Greene
Joel Grey
Merv Griffin
Andy Griffith
Bob Guccione

H
Joey Heatherton
Hugh Hefner
Sherman Hemsley
Honey Cone
Bob Hope
Hudson Brothers
Engelbert Humperdinck
Wilfrid Hyde-White

I
Ike & Tina Turner

J
The Jackson 5
Janet Jackson
Elton John
Van Johnson
Tom Jones

K
Gabe Kaplan
Alex Karras
Howard Keel
Bob Keeshan
Billie Jean King
Evel Knievel
Ted Knight
Don Knotts (five episodes) 
Harvey Korman (one episode) 
Kris Kristofferson

L
Carol Lawrence
Steve Lawrence
Jerry Lewis
Jerry Lee Lewis

M
Marilyn McCoo
Ed McMahon
Barbara McNair
Anne Meara
Don Meredith
Robert Merrill
Ricardo Montalbán

N
Jim Nabors (four episodes) 
Joe Namath
Ted Neeley
The New Seekers
Jeanette Nolan
Peter Noone

O
Carroll O'Connor
Gilbert O'Sullivan
Tony Orlando
Donny Osmond
Marie Osmond

P
Jack Palance
Bernadette Peters
Vincent Price

R
Tony Randall
Ronald Reagan
Burt Reynolds (two episodes) 
Debbie Reynolds
The Righteous Brothers
Wayne Rogers

S
Telly Savalas
Neil Sedaka
Bobby Sherman
Shields and Yarnell (six episodes) 
Dinah Shore
O. J. Simpson
Kate Smith
Martha Smith
The Smothers Brothers
Mark Spitz
Rick Springfield
Jean Stapleton
David Steinberg
McLean Stevenson
Larry Storch
Sally Struthers
The Supremes
The Sylvers

T
The Temptations
Danny Thomas
Richard Thomas
Tina Turner
Twiggy

V
Karen Valentine
Frankie Valli & The Four Seasons
Bobby Vinton

W
Lyle Waggoner (two episodes) 
Nancy Walker
Dennis Weaver
Betty White
Andy Williams
Flip Wilson
Wolfman Jack
Cynthia Wood

Notes

References

External links

  
  
  
  
 Image of Truman Capote acting in a comedy skit with Sonny and Cher for their television program in Los Angeles, California, 1973. Los Angeles Times Photographic Archive (Collection 1429). UCLA Library Special Collections, Charles E. Young Research Library, University of California, Los Angeles.

1971 American television series debuts
1977 American television series endings
1970s American musical comedy television series
1970s American sketch comedy television series
1970s American variety television series
CBS original programming
English-language television shows
Sonny & Cher
Television shows set in New York City